Dominican music may refer to:
Music of the Dominican Republic
Music of Dominica